is a Japanese light novel series written by Riku Nanano. The series originated on the Kakuyomu website in October 2017 before being published in print with illustrations by Cura by Fujimi Shobo beginning in December 2018. A manga adaptation, illustrated by Tamura Mutō, began serialization on the Shōnen Ace Plus website in September 2019.

Media

Light novel
Written by Riku Nanano, the series began publication on the novel posting website Kakuyomu on October 6, 2017. The series was later acquired by Fujimi Shobo, who began publishing the series in print with illustrations by Cura on December 20, 2018. As of November 2022, 13 volumes have been released.

In September 2021, J-Novel Club announced that they licensed the series for English publication.

Volume list

Manga
A manga adaptation, illustrated by Tamura Mutō, began serialization on Kadokawa Shoten's Shōnen Ace Plus website on September 13, 2019. As of September 2021, the series' individual chapters have been collected into two tankōbon volumes.

Volume list

Reception
Rebecca Silverman of Anime News Network praised the characters and aspects of the plot, while criticizing the "near-loli scenes". Silverman concluded her review stating "[the series is] not bad, it's [just] not all that good either". Sean Gaffney of A Case Suitable for Treatment praised the story, though Gaffney also felt its harem elements were "awkward".

In BookWalker's Next Big Light Novels poll, the series ranked fifth on the bunkobon list in 2019. The series has 200,000 copies in circulation.

References

External links
  
  
 

2018 Japanese novels
Anime and manga based on light novels
Fantasy anime and manga
Fujimi Fantasia Bunko
Harem anime and manga
J-Novel Club books
Japanese fantasy novels
Japanese webcomics
Kadokawa Shoten manga
Light novels
Light novels first published online
Shōnen manga
Webcomics in print